Armin Kogler (born 4 September 1959) is an Austrian former ski jumper.

Career
After his surprise win at the FIS Ski-Flying World Championships 1979, Kogler set a new record in Planica (1981) with a leap of 180 meters. He won two World Cup overall titles (1981 and 1982) along with a complete set of medals at the 1982 FIS Nordic World Ski Championships with gold in the individual normal hill, a silver in the team large hill, and a bronze in the individual large hill.

He would then follow it up with a silver in the team large hill event at the 1985 FIS Nordic World Ski Championships in Seefeld. Additionally, Kogler won the ski jumping event at the Holmenkollen ski festival in 1980.

Kogler's best Olympic finish was fifth in the individual large hill at the 1980 Winter Olympics in Lake Placid.

For his ski jumping successes, he was awarded the Holmenkollen medal in 1984 (shared with Lars-Erik Eriksen and Jacob Vaage). Kogler is the uncle of Martin Koch.

On 27 March 1980 he tied the world record distance at 176 metres (577 ft) Toni Innauer and Klaus Ostwald at Čerťák hill in Harrachov, Czechoslovakia.

On 26 February 1981 he set another ski jumping world record distance at 180 metres (591 ft) on Heini-Klopfer-Skiflugschanze in Oberstdorf, West Germany.

World Cup

Standings

Wins

Ski jumping world records

References

External links 
 
  - click Holmenkollmedaljen for downloadable pdf file 
  - click Vinnere for downloadable pdf file 
 

1959 births
Austrian male ski jumpers
Ski jumpers at the 1980 Winter Olympics
Ski jumpers at the 1984 Winter Olympics
Holmenkollen medalists
Holmenkollen Ski Festival winners
Living people
Olympic ski jumpers of Austria
FIS Nordic World Ski Championships medalists in ski jumping
People from Schwaz
Sportspeople from Tyrol (state)
20th-century Austrian people